The GMT 400 and similar GMT 480 was the platform for the 1988-1998 model year Chevrolet C/K / GMC Sierra full-size pickup trucks. The GMT 410, GMT 420, GMT 425, and GMT 430 were derived for full-size SUVs, including the 1992–1994 Chevrolet Blazer and 1995–2000 Tahoe, and the GMC Yukon from late 1991 to 2000.

This was the first GMT designation for the C (RWD) and K (4WD/AWD) full-size trucks and SUVs.

The engineering for the GMT400 was done by the GM Truck & Bus group, working primarily out of a rented facility at Pioneer Engineering on 9 mile Road in Warren, MI.

GMT 400 frames were built by A.O. Smith Automotive Products, Dana Holding Corporation, and Tower Automotive.

Engines included the gasoline 4.3L-V6, 5.0L-V8, 5.7L-V8, 7.4L-V8, and diesel 6.2L V8 and 6.5L V8.  Throttle body(TBI) fuel injection was used on '88-'95 gas engines.  CPI (central point injection) was used on the '96-'00 4.3L-V6, 5.0L-V8, 5.7L-V8, while the '96-'00 7.4L-V8 used SFI (sequential multiport fuel injection).   

The GMT400 series was replaced by the GMT800 vehicles beginning in 1998 (for the 1999 model year).  The GMT400 models were built at Ft. Wayne, IN, Pontiac, MI, Flint, MI, Oshawa, ON Canada, and Janesville, WI & Arlington, TX (SUVs).

Applications

See also
 GM GMT platform
 GMT400.com an online forum for the 88-98 body style GM trucks

General Motors platforms